Najat Badri (born 19 May 1988) is a Moroccan footballer who plays as a midfielder for AS FAR and the Morocco women's national team.

International career
Badri capped for Morocco at senior level during the 2018 Africa Women Cup of Nations qualification (first round).

See also
List of Morocco women's international footballers

References

External links

Living people
Moroccan women's footballers
Women's association football midfielders
Morocco women's international footballers
1988 births